KRNN is a non-commercial (NPR) music radio station in Juneau, Alaska, broadcasting on 102.7 FM. KRNN airs a variety of music genres which include, jazz, classical, and adult album alternative.

History
Capital Community Broadcasting purchased KSRJ and KFMG from White Oak Broadcasting of Alaska in 2006.

References

External links

Listen Live

RNN
NPR member stations